Clifton Park Center, formerly known as the Clifton Country Mall, is a large shopping center, located in Clifton Park, New York. As of 2022, the mall currently maintains the traditional chain anchors Boscov's, JCPenney, and a Marshalls and HomeGoods combo. The mall features 72 stores and a food court. 

In 2006 parts of the northern section of the mall were converted into a lifestyle concept.  In August 2009, a stand-alone lifestyle building, was developed. In 2011, the mall's original movie theater and its surrounding area was replaced with a much larger new “state of the art” 10 screen Regal Cinema and a five-story Hilton Garden Inn.

References

External links
Official website
LabelScar Retail History Blog entry for Clifton Park Center
Clifton Park Center on Deadmalls.com

Shopping malls in New York (state)
Tourist attractions in Saratoga County, New York
Buildings and structures in Saratoga County, New York